The Gloucestershire Royal Infirmary was a hospital in Southgate Street, Gloucester.

History
The hospital was originally established at a public house in Westgate Street 1755 but moved to more permanent premises, which were designed by Luke Singleton and erected in Southgate Street, as the Gloucestershire General Infirmary in 1756. The Infirmary merged with the Gloucestershire Eye Institution in 1878 and, with the permission of King Edward VII, the combined facility became the Gloucestershire Royal Infirmary and Eye Institution in 1909.

On the introduction of the National Health Service in 1948 it was amalgamated with the Gloucester City General Hospital. Queen Elizabeth II, accompanied by Duke of Edinburgh, paid a visit to the hospital during a visit to the city on 3 May 1955. The hospital in Southgate Street closed to in-patients in 1975 and to out-patients in the early 1980s. It was demolished in 1984 and replaced by offices known as Southgate House.

References

External links 

1755 establishments in England
1984 disestablishments in England
Hospitals disestablished in 1984
Defunct hospitals in England
Hospitals in Gloucestershire